Opus in Swing is an album by saxophonist Frank Wess recorded in 1956 and released on the Savoy label.

Reception

Allmusic reviewer by Jim Newsom stated, "Wess' playing is superb, while the guitar solos of then-newcomer Kenny Burrell shine brightly above the solid accompaniment of the swinging rhythm section. This is timeless music".

Track listing 
All compositions by Frank Wess except where noted
 "Kansas City Side" – 8:28	
 "Southern Exposure" (Kenny Burrell) – 6:46	
 "Over the Rainbow" (Harold Arlen, Yip Harburg) – 5:57	
 "Wess Side" – 4:58	
 "East Wind" – 5:09

Personnel 
Frank Wess – flute
Kenny Burrell, Freddie Green – guitar
Eddie Jones - bass
Kenny Clarke - drums

References 

Frank Wess albums
1956 albums
Savoy Records albums
Albums produced by Ozzie Cadena
Albums recorded at Van Gelder Studio